The list of radio stations in Japan lists all the national/regional radio stations in Japan.

Because of governmental regulation, Japan has a relatively small number of radio stations. Japan also has a comparatively smaller number of radio listeners nationwide than most other developed countries as well as countries in the geographic region. This is because of several factors, including the cultural difference in perception of radio, the fact that cars in Japan come with dashboard televisions fitted as standard, as well as general disinterest in the medium among working younger audiences compared with other mediums, especially television. Generally, each prefecture has three NHK stations (two by 2025), one commercial AM station (some are also on FM), and one commercial FM station. Heavily populated areas, such as Kantō region or Kansai region, have more stations.

There are also an increasing number of AM stations that start broadcasting on FM (on 90-95 MHz) as a supplement.

The listed stations with ★ signs also broadcast television. Many stations have multiple frequencies (repeaters).

Certain AM-only radio stations (or AM stations with limited FM simulcast coverage) will be broadcasting solely in FM by 2028. The switch will not affect Hokkaido and Akita Prefectures and will continue AM-FM radio simulcasts. NHK is excluded from the switchover, as they have separate plans to consolidate its radio services.

Networks
All networks are broadcast in Japanese, except MegaNet and AFN.

Former

Educational
Open University of Japan: FM, Satellite (radio closed down in October 2018)
JOUD-FM:
77.1 MHz Tokyo
78.8 MHz Maebashi

Hokkaidō

Tōhoku region

Kantō region

Chūbu region

Kansai region

Chūgoku & Shikoku Region

Kyūshū region

Nationwide stations
Some stations have multiple channels.

Shortwave
Nikkei Radio Broadcasting Corporation (Radio Nikkei, 2 channels)
Radio Nikkei 1: 3.925 MHz SW, 6.055 MHz SW and 9.595 MHz SW
Radio Nikkei 2: 3.945 MHz SW, 6.115 MHz SW and 9.76 MHz SW

Satellite broadcasting
Certain satellite providers distribute radio channels that are tailored to every musical genres such as from SKY PerfecTV! and Usen (Music AirBee! and Sound Planet). In the education field, the Open University of Japan broadcast educational programming only on satellite TV (radio broadcasts and free-to-air TV broadcasts ended since October 2018).

Community FM stations

Since January 10, 1992, the Ministry of Internal Affairs and Communications started accepting applications for community FM licenses which are allowed on municipal level. Currently, as of April 2021, there are roughly 335 community FM stations across Japan.

Community FM stations with English articles include:
Kanagawa Prefecture
Zushi Hayama Community Broadcasting (Shōnan Beach FM): Hayama and Zushi, 78.9 MHz FM
Chiba Prefecture
Ichikawa FM JOZZ3AZ-FM: Ichikawa, 83.0 MHz
Shizuoka Prefecture
Hamamatsu FM Broadcasting Company JOZZ6AB-FM (FM Haro!): Hamamatsu, 76.1 MHz FM
Aichi Prefecture
FM Toyohashi JOZZ6AA-FM: Toyohashi, 84.3 MHz FM
Hiroshima Prefecture
Chūgoku Communication Network JOZZ8AG-FM (FM Chupea): Hiroshima, 76.6 MHz FM
FM Fukuyama JOZZ8AA-FM (Radio Bingo): Fukuyama, 77.7 MHz FM
Onomichi FM Broadcasting Company JOZZ8AF-FM (FM Onomichi): Onomichi, 79.4 MHz FM

Others
Highway advisory radio: 1620 kHz AM
Roadside Station radio: 1629 kHz AM

Notes

References

Japan